The Sash of the Two Orders (or Banda da Grã-Cruz das Duas Ordens) was a Portuguese decoration that combined the Grand Crosses of the Military Orders of Christ and Aviz.

History 
The decoration was first established in 1789 by Queen Maria I, alongside the similar Sash of the Three Orders. From 1823 onwards it was awarded to the members of the Portuguese royal house who were neither the monarch nor the heir to the throne (both of whom wore the Three Orders Sash), as well as princes from foreign royal houses.

In the wake of the 5 October 1910 revolution the Republic abolished the decoration along with all royal orders (save for the Order of the Tower and Sword), but would later resurrect it in 1931, during which it continued to be awarded to foreign heads of state and royalty. It was eventually retired for good in 1962, when the Three Orders Sash became exclusive to the President.

Insignia 
 The badge and star of the decoration were identical to that of the Three Orders Sash, but with only the two crosses of the Orders of Christ and Aviz. From 1825 to 1830 the cross of Aviz was replaced by the cross of the Order of St. James of the Sword, with one such decoration bestowed on Prince Maximilian of Saxony in 1825. In 1857, the decoration conferred on Prince Albert of Saxe-Coburg and Gotha had the cross of Christ replaced by that of St. James, as he had already been decorated with the Order of Christ. During the era of the monarchy the badge was surmounted by the royal crown; after 1910 the crown was replaced by a laurel wreath.
 The sash of the decoration usually constituted two equal stripes of red and green (Type I); from 1825 to 1830 the green was replaced by violet (Type II), with the red replaced by violet on Prince Albert's decoration in 1857 (Type III).

Notable recipients 
Before 1931:
 King George V
From 1931 to 1962:
 Edward, Prince of Wales (25 April 1931)
 Charlotte, Grand Duchess of Luxembourg (23 January 1949)
 Farouk I, King of Egypt and the Sudan (5 May 1951)
 René Coty, 17th President of France (15 November 1954)
 Marcos Pérez Jiménez, 35th President of Venezuela (29 July 1955)

References

Orders, decorations, and medals of Portugal
Orders of chivalry awarded to heads of state, consorts and sovereign family members
Awards established in 1789